Luise Koch (11 October 1860 Bremen – 14 March 1934 in Bremen) was a German educator, politician (DDP) and women's rights activist.

Life 
Koch was the daughter of the businessman Carl August Koch and his wife, the piano teacher Lina Koch. She attended a private girls' school.

In 1904 she founded the local chapter of the German Association for women's suffrage (Deutscher Verband für Frauenstimmrecht) and was from 1904 to 1919 chairwoman of the Bremen association. In 1916 she was elected to the board of the German Reich Association for Women's Suffrage.

With the start of World War I, she called on the 600 members of the Association to engage in war work less for their own rights and more for the needs of family and country.

In 1916, Koch was elected to the board of the German Reich Association for Women's Suffrage. In 1917, she protested against "the forthcoming reform of the Bremer suffrage [...] that the right to vote in one direction referring only to the male sex". In 1918, she was a member of the new group Women in Bremen, and represented them in both women's suffrage associations and the Social Democrats.

In 1919, Koch was a member of the German Democratic Party (DDP). She represented the party in the Bremer National Constituent Assembly of 1919–20, however, she did not stand for the Bremen Parliament.

Literature 
 Bremer Nachrichten vom 11. Oktober 1930: Bremer Verein für Frauenstimmrecht.

References 

German feminists
German suffragists
1860 births
1934 deaths
German women's rights activists
Politicians from Bremen
German Democratic Party politicians
20th-century German women politicians